Cylindrus obtusus is a species of air-breathing land snail, a terrestrial pulmonate gastropod mollusk in the family Helicidae, the typical snails.

This species is endemic to Austria. It lives on certain mountain tops in the Eastern Alps, in limestone habitats, e.g.  the Dürrnstein, Ötscher and Gesäuse Mountains. It often lives crowded, in moss, in rock crevices.

Ecology 

The lifespan of Cylindrus obtusus is probably several years.

The dispersal rate of Cylindrus obtusus is about 3 cm per day.

References

Cylindrus
Endemic fauna of Austria
Gastropods described in 1805
Taxonomy articles created by Polbot